James Henry Snow  (born 15 September 1934) is a former Australian  politician.

Snow was born in the Melbourne suburb of Surrey Hills, Victoria and graduated in pharmacy from the Victorian College of Pharmacy.  He worked as a goat farmer, pharmacist and community worker for Queanbeyan City Council.  He was elected to the Australian House of Representatives as the member for Eden-Monaro in 1983.  He was defeated by Gary Nairn in the 1996 election.

Prior to parliament Jim Snow was an honorary lieutenant (pharmacist) in the military reserve of officers for some years. Snow chaired the government (Parliamentary Labor Party) caucus from 1993 to 1996 after chairing the Transport and Communications Policy Committee. He was also Convenor of the Pharmaceutical Benefits Working Group and the Land Transport and Postal Services Working group. He convened 'search conferences' to find solutions and resolve conflicts in both local and national issues, including two on the need to control feral animals, the first of which was followed by the first National Feral Animal control program. Those and other search conferences brought together local and national expertise and were facilitated by Dr Alistair Crombie of the Australian National University, Geoff Pryor, Penny Lockwood, Kevin Hambly and Justin Mahon. The search conferences also dealt with Land Transport, Fishing and Abalone issues, recycling human waste and the future of Montague Island following the controversial automation of the lighthouse. The latter conference led to agreement to have national parks supervision and a human presence on the island. 
Snow moved a private member motion (House of Representatives Hansard 17 December 1992)that the parliament deal with drug-related crime, health and social problems by initiating the availability of heroin, cocaine and amphetamines on prescription by addiction trained physicians and dispensers. On 18 November 1993 he moved that the executive move for constitutional change to remove state governments and reform and strengthen local government. Neither motion reached a vote.
After leaving parliament Jim Snow and his wife, Lesley, worked with Aboriginal organisations and he became patron of Winnunga Nimmityjah Aboriginal Medical Service. He is a foundation member of the Drug Law Reform Foundation and served as co-convenor of Beyond Federation which seeks constitutional reform, including the removal of the state tier of government and he serves as a member of 'Home in Queanbeyan' an initiative providing accommodation and care to the mentally ill. He has edited four editions of the 'After Parliament Guide' printed by the parliament to assist former members in their transition from parliamentary life. He was made a life member of the Australian Labor Party.

Snow was one of three members of the ALP Caucus who were absent in the vote that saw Paul Keating oust Bob Hawke as Prime Minister and ALP leader. The others were Foreign Minister Gareth Evans who was out of the country and Con Sciacca who was instead with his dying son.

Notes

1934 births
Living people
Australian Labor Party members of the Parliament of Australia
Members of the Australian House of Representatives
Members of the Australian House of Representatives for Eden-Monaro
20th-century Australian politicians
People from Surrey Hills, Victoria
Australian pharmacists
Politicians from Melbourne